Mele Hufanga (born 18 October 1994) is a New Zealand rugby league player. She has represented Tonga internationally in rugby league.

Biography

Rugby union 
Hufanga scored 16 tries for Auckland in the 2015 Farah Palmer Cup season. Hufanga played for Counties Manukau in the 2020 season of the Farah Palmer Cup. In 2021 she played for the Moana Pasifika women's sevens team at the Takiwhitu Tutūru tournament in Wellington.

Hufanga signed with the Blues for the inaugural season of Super Rugby Aupiki. She scored a try in their match against Matatū in round 2 of the 2022 Super Rugby Aupiki season.

Hufanga captained Tonga at the 2022 Oceania Championship in New Zealand. She scored a brace of tries against Samoa in the opening match of the tournament. She scored again against Fiji in their 34–7 loss in the second game. She scored four tries in her sides 108–7 trouncing of Papua New Guinea in their final match.

Rugby league 
Hufanga represented Tonga in a test match against Niue in 2020. She competed for the Kiwi Ferns at the delayed 2021 Women's Rugby League World Cup in England.

References

External links 
 Blues Profile

1994 births
Living people
New Zealand female rugby union players